The Old Guaranty Bank Building is a historic bank building located at 500 Jefferson Street in Lafayette, Louisiana.

Built in 1905, it is a two-story brick and terra cotta Colonial Revival commercial building.

The building was listed on the National Register of Historic Places on July 12, 1984.

See also
National Register of Historic Places listings in Lafayette Parish, Louisiana

References

Bank buildings on the National Register of Historic Places in Louisiana
Colonial Revival architecture in Louisiana
Commercial buildings completed in 1905
Lafayette Parish, Louisiana
National Register of Historic Places in Lafayette Parish, Louisiana
1905 establishments in Louisiana